Anthea Shirley Askey (2 March 1933 – 28 February 1999) was an English actress, particularly prominent on television in the 1950s.

Anthea Askey was born in Golders Green, north London, to the comedian and actor Arthur Askey, and his wife Elizabeth May Swash. She featured in many television roles alongside her father.

Her early television appearances included Love and Kisses, where she played Rose Brown, whose father Bill was played by her father; while other TV and films include The Love Match, Ramsbottom Rides Again, Before Your Very Eyes, Living It Up, The Dickie Henderson Half-Hour, Arthur's Treasured Volumes and a cameo appearance in Make Mine a Million in 1959.

In 1993, she appeared in Climb the Greasy Pole: Part 1, an episode of The Darling Buds of May.

Askey died in Worthing, West Sussex, on 28 February 1999, two days before her 66th birthday.

References

External links

References

1933 births
1999 deaths
English television actresses
People from Golders Green
20th-century British actresses
20th-century English women
20th-century English people
20th-century British businesspeople